Major-General Shahida Malik (Urdu: شاهدہ ملک; HI(M), SI(M)), was a senior officer of the Pakistan Army who was the former Surgeon-General of the Pakistan Army Medical Corps.

She is the first lady officer in the Pakistan Army to have reached to two-star rank. Trained as a doctor, she was appointed the Inspector-General Hospitals as well as deputy commander of the Pakistan Army Medical Corps before retiring in 2004.

Early life
She was born in the ((jhatla)) village of district chakwal. She graduated with her MBBS degree from Fatima Jinnah Medical College, Lahore and got selected for Army Medical Corps in 1970.

First woman general
She was promoted to Major General rank on 17 June 2002 on the orders of the then Chief of Army Staff, General Pervez Musharraf.

References

Year of birth missing (living people)
Living people
Pakistani generals
Pakistani military doctors
Female army generals
Women in warfare post-1945
Pakistani female military officers